Somaratne Dissanayake is a Sri Lankan film director, Screenwriter and Producer. He is the Chairman of Sri Lanka Rupavahini Corporation and the president of the Film Makers Guild of Sri Lanka (FMG). He won the Peace prize of Chicago International Children's Film Festival and bronze award for Independent Theatrical Feature Films at Worldfest Houston for his debut film, Saroja (2000). In 2007, he received Presidential award for directing Samanala Thatu (2006).

Biography 
Somaratne abandoned his life in Australia to pursue a career in film. He started the stage play, Mee Pura Wesio in 1984 and then a television drama, Iti Pahan in mid 1990s. He did not come to the cinema industry at once. He studied cinema for another 10 years. He earned his MA in performing arts from the University of Sydney, Australia. He also obtained his PhD in cinema from the University of Colombo.

He made his debut in the Sinhala film in 2000 with a controversial but blockbuster film Saroja (2000 film). He is also well known for other films he directed and screened such as Punchi Suranganavi, Sooriya Arana, Samanala Thatu, Siri Raja Siri, Bindu and Siri Parakum. In 2016, Dissanayake directed and screened the film Sarigama which was a sinhala remake of the world famous film The Sound of Music. All of his films have been well-received, and almost every film has been a record success.

He is married to producer and television host Renuka Balasooriya.

In January 2015, he was appointed as the Chairman of the Sri Lanka Rupavahini Corporation (SLRC), only to resign later that year in August, due to personal reasons.

Alleged Curse 
Shortly after the release of Jangi Hora. The Sri Lankan release of the film ended up unpopular and cinemas stopped showings of the film abruptly within a few days although the film was promoted heavily through movie trailers that aired on television to billboards in the streets of Colombo. Anyhow following the film's lack of success, Somaratne started to face financial difficulty and became thinner due to lack of money to buy food and eventually he started to make Sinhabahu, a film about the legendary Sinhabahu starring Jackson Anthony, however when it was reported that Jackson had got admitted to hospital following a series of injuries caused by an elephant slipping twice onto his red cab. Because of this, the film is now in development hell. Some people link this with a curse caused by the release of Jangi Hora into Sri Lankan theaters.

However it appears that Somaratne Dissanayake has returned to his original weight and is doing fine now but is now slightly depressed. He also released a trailer for Sinhabahu but with a different actor playing the title role instead of Jackson Anthony. Jackson was soon discharged from hospital with his family who took care of him.

Awards and nominations

Filmography

References

External links
 බෙදාහැරීම සංස්ථාව සතුකර ගැනීමට කැප වෙනවා
 වැඩේ හරි! ක්‍රමය වැරැදියි

Living people
Sri Lankan film directors
Curses
1946 births